James Neil Sneddon is an Australian linguist who specializes in Indonesian and languages of Sulawesi.

Education
He studied Linguistics and Indonesian at the University of Sydney. In 1974, he obtained a doctorate from the Australian National University, where he completed his dissertation Tondano Phonology and Grammar. He was an associate professor at Griffith University in Queensland.

Career
Sneddon has written numerous works on the Indonesian language, including grammar textbooks. He is the author of the book Colloquial Jakartan Indonesian, which describes the Jakarta dialect. In the book The Indonesian Language: Its History and Role in Modern Society, he presents the history of the Indonesian language and its function in modern Indonesia.

Sneddon's proto-language reconstructions include Proto-Minahasan and Proto-Sangiric.

Books
 Indonesian Reference Grammar (1996)
 Indonesian: A Comprehensive Grammar (1996)
 Understanding Indonesian Grammar: A Student’s Reference And Workbook. (2000)
 The Indonesian Language: Its History and Role in Modern Society (2003)
 Colloquial Jakartan Indonesian (2006)

References

Living people
Linguists of Austronesian languages
Linguists from Australia
University of Sydney alumni
Australian National University alumni
Year of birth missing (living people)